Orophicus is a genus of ground beetles in the family Carabidae. There are at least two described species in Orophicus, found in Mauritius.

Species
These two species belong to the genus Orophicus:
 Orophicus antelmei Alluaud, 1925
 Orophicus vinsoni Jeannel, 1951

References

Platyninae